Ferry Graf (14 December 1931, Ternitz - 26 July 2017, Jyväskylä) was an Austrian singer, who later became a Finnish citizen.

Career
In 1959, Graf was selected by the Austrian broadcaster Österreichischer Rundfunk (ORF) to represent the country in the Eurovision Song Contest 1959, with the German language song "Der K und K Kalypso aus Wien" (The K and K Calypso from Vienna). The song ended second to last, in joint ninth place receiving four points. Although the song was released as a single, it was not a commercial success.

In the years following his Eurovision participation, Graf made a few appearances in Austrian and German TV, including, playing at ZDF-Hitparade in 1969, but made no major successes. In the 1970s, he moved to Finland, where he formed his own band, performing Hillbilly music, as well as German cover versions of Elvis Presley's classic song.

Ferry Graf had a Finnish citizenship and lived in Jyväskylä.

See also
Eurovision Song Contest 1959
Austria in the Eurovision Song Contest

References

External links 
 

1931 births
2017 deaths
Eurovision Song Contest entrants for Austria
20th-century Austrian male singers
Eurovision Song Contest entrants of 1959
Austrian emigrants to Finland
Naturalized citizens of Finland